The 2018 Laos dam collapse was the collapse of Saddle Dam D, part of a larger hydroelectric dam system under construction in southeast Laos's Champasak Province, on 23 July 2018. The dam collapse lead to widespread destruction and homelessness among the local population in neighbouring Attapeu Province. As of 25 September, 40 people were confirmed dead, at least 98 more were missing (maybe as many as 1,100 more people), and 6,600 others were displaced.

Background
Construction of the earth-filled Saddle Dam D near Paksong, part of the $1.2bn (£915m) hydroelectric project by Xe-Pian Xe-Namnoy Power Company (PNPC), was begun in 2013.  The hydroelectric project was a build-operate-transfer project. PNPC is a joint investment venture formed in March 2012 by SK Engineering and Construction (SK E&C), Korea Western Power (KOWEPO), Ratchaburi Electricity Generating Holding (RATCH), and Lao Holding State Enterprise (LHSE). SK E&C holds a 26% stake in PNPC, LHSE 24%, and RATCH and KOWEPO equally own the remaining shares. Part of an overall project to build two main dams and five auxiliaries, by the time of the collapse, it was near to completion and was intended to open for business in 2019.

Although landlocked, Laos is traversed by many intertwining rivers, which has encouraged their damming. The dam's construction was part of what has been described as an "ambitious ... scheme to become the 'battery' of Asia", due to the country's location on the Mekong river and "abundant natural resources". The dam was intended to form a chain with other dams in the adjacent province of Champasak, across the Houay Makchanh, Xe Namnoy and Xe Pian rivers.

The dam, close to the Cambodian border, was intended to operate to a capacity of 410 megawatts, and earn revenue for the government by exporting 90% of the electricity produced to Thailand, which is more economically prosperous and developed compared to Laos.

Environmental pressure groups have long been critical of the Laotian government's ambitions regarding hydroelectric power, which have involved building multiple dams on the Mekong as well as on its tributaries. Concern has focused on potential damage to the flora and fauna and the animal societies dependent on the river to survive. Neighboring countries, like Cambodia and Vietnam that are downstream from the dams and rely heavily on the Mekong for fishing, food, agricultural irrigation, transport, tourism and cultural traditions, have expressed concern that Laos' hydroelectric ambitions could "disrupt vital ecosystems and their own river systems". The dam building program has regularly required the displacement and transplanting of inhabitants of villages that are found to obstruct dam construction, the benefits of which "are mainly enjoyed outside of the country", said environmental activists.

The company denied that the dam had collapsed, blaming recent heavy weather for the flooding, which had resulted in torrential rain filling the dam beyond capacity and overflowing, it said, which exacerbated the flooding which had already taken place downstream. A spokesperson for SK E&C said, "we believe that parts of the upper area of the dam were lost due to heavy rains and [then] the water overflowed". The International Rivers organization—whom the Washington Post described as "a nongovernmental group generally critical of such projects"—suggested that the collapse illustrates the "major risks" involved if construction is "unable to cope with extreme weather conditions", as, particularly in Laos, "unpredictable and extreme weather events are becoming more frequent". Indeed, an evacuation order had been in place for the area at the bottom of the dam due to cracks having been discovered in it. This damage had been reported to the company by South Korean contractors "at least a day before" the flooding, reported news outlets. Engineers from SK E&C apparently informed the PNPC that the top of the dam's structure had been washed away by 9 p.m. the previous night. Repair work was delayed because of the heavy rain. Furthermore, the Agence France-Presse (AFP) reported that it had obtained documents showing that "11 centimetres of subsidence was found at the centre of the dam" as early as the previous Friday. This subsidence was severe enough to prevent the use of emergency repair equipment.

On 11 September 2017, the reservoir for a dam under construction on the Nam Ao River in Phaxay district, Xiangkhouang Province collapsed after heavy rains in the area. In December 2016, the Xekaman 3 dam in Dak Cheung District, Sekong Province, had to be shut down after six years of usage due to damage in water tunnels.

Collapse

The dam collapse occurred around 8 p.m. on Monday 23 July, and caused immediate flash flooding through the villages of Yai Thae, Hinlad, Ban Mai, Thasengchan, Tha Hin, and Samong, all in Sanamxay district. Homes, roads and bridges were swept away. The portion of the dam that collapsed was reported to be a saddle dam, known as "Saddle D", or "an auxiliary structure used to hold water beyond what is held by the main dam". The CEO of one of the companies involved stated that "[it] was fractured and the water had leaked to the downstream area and down to the Xe-Pian River which is about five kilometres from the dam".

Earlier in the day on 23 July, Lee Kang Yeol, Head of Resettlement Office of the Xe-Pian Xe-Namnoy Power Company Resettlement Office sent a warning letter to the provincial resettlement offices in Champasak and Attapeu Provinces indicating that water levels in the dam were high and that dam failure was imminent. The letter further urged that all residents in the Xe Pian river valley be evacuated to higher ground immediately.

Lao News Agency reported that "several human lives" had been lost, and that around 6,000 people may have been made homeless as a result. There were no precise figures regarding casualties within the first 24 hours, although The Guardian reported "hundreds missing" and "several" confirmed dead early the following morning. At least six villages were severely affected—around 1,300 households—with many survivors stranded on their rooftops and in trees. By 25 July, nearly 3,000 people had been rescued. The village of Ban Mai alone had 50 inhabitants known to be missing. Rescue efforts were complicated by the fact that the area is densely forested with no mobile-phone coverage, which may also have contributed to the uncertainty as to casualty rates. What roads previously existed were washed away in the floods, and the affected villages were only approachable by either helicopter or flat-bottomed boats.

As of 23 September, 40 people were confirmed dead, at least 98 more were missing and 6,600 others were displaced.

Response and aid
Government agencies and the power company jointly commenced a rescue and evacuation of villages still in danger, amid rising water levels. They were joined by a South Korean company, SK Engineering and Construction, which was a stakeholder in the dam's construction. The Prime Minister of Laos, Thongloun Sisoulith, suspended his immediate meetings and travelled in person to the site, as did the President and board of SK E&C. Sisoulith also called in both the police and the army, and declared the area a disaster zone on Tuesday. Local government requested emergency aid from central government as well as neighbouring communities. One of the largest banks in Laos, Banque Pour Le Commerce Exterieur Lao, set up a relief donation fund seeking to raise 2 billion kip (US$238,000) for victims of the disaster. The neighbouring Asian countries of China, Malaysia, Philippines, Singapore, Thailand and Vietnam have also expressed readiness to provide any assistance needed by Laos. In the immediate aftermath of the disaster, Chinese companies and businesses in Laos that were involved in the construction of China-Laos railway immediately joined the rescue work efforts. Thai rescue workers reportedly complained that Laos had shown lethargy in allowing them entry, meaning that they had been kept waiting at the border. The International Red Cross organized water purification devices for the area as each village lost its food supplies, while the Asean Coordinating Centre for Humanitarian Assistance (AHA Centre) relief items were dispatched from its warehouse in Malaysia to Vientiane by the Royal Malaysian Air Force (RMAF).

On 26 July, South Korean President Moon Jae-in ordered a relief team to be sent into the country, a rare order from their President for any accident in foreign country since a South Korean firm was involved in the incident. Singapore announced that they will be sending their Civil Defence Force (SCDF) officers and US$100,000 to aid relief efforts, with the Singapore Red Cross (SRC) also announced S$50,000 in humanitarian aid. Singapore Armed Forces (SAF) delivered S$280,000 in flood relief supplies on Thursday evening while officers from SCDF will arrive on Friday. The Vietnamese government has provided a total of US$200,000 relief aid, with another US$50,000 coming from their Defence Ministry and another VND300 million (US$13,000) from Agriculture and Rural Development Ministry. Vietnam Electricity (EVN) have contributed around VND1 billion (US$43,000) while the Vietnam Red Cross Society (VRC) Central Committee handed over US$50,000 to the Laos embassy in Vietnam. The Vietnamese People's Army (VPA) sent a contingent team of 100 officers, including medics and rescue vehicles to assist in relief efforts.

A 32-strong team People's Liberation Army (PLA) medical contingent was also dispatched, together with the arrival of relief supplies from Thailand. Mercy Malaysia has sent a rapid assessment team to assist in both severe flooding caused by the dam collapse and tropical storm Son-Tinh, with the Malaysian government also conveyed to their Laotian counterpart that they will donating RM400,000 (US$100,000) to assist Laos to facilitate its relief efforts. On 30 July, the Cambodian government donated $100,000 relief aid. The following day, Chinese relief aid began to arrived into the Laotian capital. South Korean government also deciding to send more aid along with the offer of US$1 million aid shortly after the arrival of medicine and relief supplies from the country. Another relief team consisting of 19 medical personnel was sent by South Korea on 7 August. Apart from the aid of South Korean government, SK Group has offered to donate $10 million relief aid, Korean Air has sent 36,000 litres of mineral water with 2,000 blankets and Lotte Group has donated US$100,000. Foreign individuals living in Laos also helping to deliver aid by raising money from their food businesses. Government compensation for lives lost amounted to 1.5 million Lao kip (U.S. $176) for each person.

Aftermath
Within days of the disaster, survivors were questioning why they had received so little warning before it happened, "with some of the displaced saying they were warned to evacuate homes only hours before disaster struck". It was unclear how the damage affect the overall plan for Laos' hydroelectric ambitions. Meanwhile, shares in the various companies connected to the project, particularly SK E&C plunged immediately following the disaster.

See also 
 List of dam failures
 List of hydroelectric power station failures
 Dam failure
 Tropical Storm Son-Tinh (2018) – a tropical cyclone that is strongly related to or caused the dam collapse.

Notes

References

Sources 

 
 
 
 
 
 
 
 
 
 
 
 
 
 
 
 
 
 
 
 
 
 
 
 
 
 
 
 
 
 
 
 
 
 
 

 
 
 
 
 
 
 
 
 
 
 
 
 
 
 
 
 
 
 
 
 
 
 

2018 dam collapse
2018 dam collapse
Dam failures in Asia
2018 industrial disasters
Dam collapse
July 2018 events in Asia
Attapeu province
Floods in Asia
2018 floods in Asia
2018 dam collapse
Champasak province